Dick G. Bumpas (born December 19, 1949) is a retired American football coach and former player.  He was an All-American defensive tackle at Arkansas and an assistant football coach at several college football programs, most notably an 11-year stint as the defensive coordinator at TCU.

Early life and playing career
Bumpas grew up in Fort Smith, Arkansas, where he graduated from Southside High School in 1967 before enrolling at the University of Arkansas on a football scholarship.

Playing for Coach Frank Broyles at Arkansas, he helped the Razorbacks win a Southwest Conference title in 1968 before defeating Georgia in the Sugar Bowl on New Year's Day, 1969.  While his junior season was remembered most for Arkansas' loss to Texas in the Game of the Century, Bumpas earned All-SWC honors and became a Consensus All-American as a senior in 1970.

After graduating from Arkansas, Bumpas played professional football for the BC Lions of the Canadian Football League and the Memphis Southmen of the World Football League.

Coaching career

Early years
Bumpas began his coaching career when Broyles hired him as a graduate assistant at Arkansas in 1977  The next year, he took his first full-time job coaching defensive linemen at West Point. That season began a stretch of 26 in which Bumpas coached at 11 different schools.  This stretch included stints working under coaches including Fisher DeBerry, Johnny Majors and Lou Holtz - and made him one of the few men to have coached at all three service academies.

TCU
During the journeyman phase of his career, Bumpas' time at Kansas State coincided with Wildcat safety Gary Patterson concluding his playing career in 1981 and beginning his coaching career as a graduate assistant under head coach Jim Dickey in 1982.  This was the first of three times he would cross paths with Patterson as fellow assistants - along with their corresponding stints at Tennessee Tech, Utah State and Navy.

Patterson hired Bumpas to be his defensive coordinator at TCU in 2004, where they built the Frogs into a perennial defensive powerhouse running Patterson's 4-2-5 scheme. Bumpas' time in Fort Worth saw TCU jump from Conference USA to the Mountain West to the Big 12, winning five conference titles along the way.

Under Bumpas' leadership, three Horned Frogs earned AP 1st Team All-American honors on defense:
Jerry Hughes - 2009
Tejay Johnson - 2010
Paul Dawson - 2014

Additionally, 22 different TCU defenders earned 1st Team All-Conference honors under Bumpas:
Marvin Godbolt - 2004
Tommy Blake - 2005, 2006
Chase Ortiz - 2005, 2006, 2007
Quincy Butler - 2005
Jason Phillips - 2006, 2007
Marvin White - 2006
Jerry Hughes - 2008, 2009
Robert Henson - 2008
Stephen Hodge - 2008
Daryl Washington - 2009
Rafael Priest - 2009
Nick Sanders - 2009
Wayne Daniels - 2010
Tank Carder - 2010, 2011
Tejay Johnson - 2010
Tanner Brock - 2010
Greg McCoy - 2011
Stansly Maponga - 2011, 2012
Devonte Fields - 2012
Jason Verrett - 2012, 2013
Paul Dawson - 2014
Chris Hackett - 2014

Conference titles
Over the course of his coaching career, Bumpas won eight conference titles with four different programs and in five different leagues:

Bowl games
Bumpas coached in 19 bowl games at 7 different programs, with his teams amassing a record of 14-5 in those games:

Retirement
Bumpas announced his retirement from coaching on February 3, 2015.  He was inducted into the Arkansas Sports Hall of Fame in while still coaching at TCU in 2011 and into the Southwest Conference Hall of Fame in 2017. He currently resides in Garfield, Arkansas with his wife, Gloria.

References

1949 births
Living people
All-American college football players
American football defensive tackles
Arkansas Razorbacks football players
Memphis Southmen players
BC Lions players
Air Force Falcons football coaches
Arkansas Razorbacks football coaches
Army Black Knights football coaches
Kansas State Wildcats football coaches
Navy Midshipmen football coaches
Notre Dame Fighting Irish football coaches
TCU Horned Frogs football coaches
Tennessee Tech Golden Eagles football coaches
Utah State Aggies football
Western Michigan Broncos football coaches
Players of American football from Arkansas
People from Fort Smith, Arkansas